The Aegis Ballistic Missile Defense System (Aegis BMD or ABMD), also known as Sea-Based Midcourse, is a United States Department of Defense Missile Defense Agency program developed to provide missile defense against short to intermediate-range ballistic missiles. The program is part of the United States national missile defense strategy and European NATO missile defence system.

Aegis BMD is an expansion of the Aegis Combat System deployed on warships, designed to intercept ballistic missiles in post-boost phase and prior to reentry. Aegis BMD-equipped vessels can engage potential threats using the Standard Missile 3 mid-course interceptors and the Standard Missile 2 and Standard Missile 6 terminal-phase interceptors. Notable subcontractors and technical experts include Boeing Defense, Space & Security, Alliant Techsystems (ATK), Honeywell, Engility, Naval Surface Warfare Center, SPAWAR Systems Center, Johns Hopkins University Applied Physics Laboratory (JHU/APL), and the Massachusetts Institute of Technology Lincoln Laboratory (Lincoln Lab).

On November 17, 2020, an Aegis Ballistic Missile Defense (BMD) System-equipped destroyer intercepted and destroyed a threat-representative Intercontinental Ballistic Missile (ICBM) target with a Standard Missile-3 (SM-3) Block IIA missile during a flight test demonstration in the broad ocean area northeast of Hawaii.

History and technical development

Origins

The current effort to deploy Aegis ballistic missile defense (ABMD) was begun during the mid-1980s as part of President Ronald Reagan's Strategic Defense Initiative (SDI). The SDI plan was initially for a space-based railgun system. However, technological constraints caused the system to be transformed into a surface-based system known as the Lightweight Exo-Atmospheric Projectile (LEAP). The original testing of the LEAP was done as part of the Army LEAP program.

Later, SDIO worked with the Navy to test the LEAP on the Terrier missile. The Terrier LEAP demonstration program lasted from 1991 into 1995 and consisted of four flight tests. Two of these were intercept tests in early 1995; both failed to intercept—the first had a software error in the second-stage booster, the second had a squib (pyrotechnic switch to connect power) in the kinetic kill vehicle that was mounted backwards and failed to fire.

Program history and development
During the late 1990s, the U.S. Navy was tasked to provide a weapon system for exploratory testing of LEAP. This phase was designated the Aegis LEAP Intercept (ALI) program. The program was for two successful intercepts in five attempts. On June 13, 2002, the second successful ALI intercept occurred during the FM-3 flight test mission. Initial Aegis BMD success may have contributed to President George W. Bush's decision to deploy an emergency ballistic missile capability by late 2004.

Upon the completion of the ALI program, Aegis BMD was transitioned to the production phase. The first Block I production SM-3 was delivered in October 2004, and the Aegis 3.0 update was delivered in 2005.

This system was given major new importance by President Obama in September 2009, when he announced plans to scrap the plans for a missile defense site in Poland, in favor of missile defense systems located on U.S. Navy warships. On 18 September 2009, Russian Prime Minister Vladimir Putin welcomed Obama's plans for missile defense which may include stationing American Aegis armed warships in the Black Sea, as these are likely to be less effective against Russia's missile attacks. In 2009 several U.S. Navy ships were fitted with SM-3 missiles to serve this function, which complements the Patriot systems already deployed by American units.  Warships of Japan and Australia also have been given weapons and technology to enable them to participate as well.

Current Aegis BMD hardware includes the SM-3 Block-1a missile and other improvements to the Aegis Weapons System. Future development of the Aegis BMD system includes Launch on Remote capability, upgraded SM-3 avionics and hardware, and an upgraded Aegis Weapon System. In 2012 Aegis Ballistic Missile Defense will merge with Aegis Open Architecture and deliver the benefits of both platforms. The Launch on Remote capability involves the use of off-board sensors, such as the Space Tracking and Surveillance System to provide a targeting solution for a SM-3 launch.

As of 2022, variations of the Aegis BMD system currently  in service are the 4.x, 5.x and 6.x. The improved versions are equipped with advanced processors and software, as well as upgraded variants of the SM-3 interceptor missile. BMD capable ships can have their BMD capabilities upgraded from earlier versions to later versions. BMD version 6.x comes with AN/SPY-6 radar in Flight III and Flight IIA destroyers.

US Army Integrated Air and Missile Defense Battle Command System (IBCS) program will integrate MIM-104 Patriot, NASAMS, AN/TPY-2 and F-35 Lightning II radars with Aegis radars to create a plug and fight network of land, sea, and air-based sensors and aid surface-to-air Patriot and THAAD launchers in anti-ballistic missile capabilities.

SM-3, SM-2 Block IV, SM-6 and GPI interceptors

The Aegis BMD uses the RIM-161 Standard Missile 3 mid-course interceptors and the RIM-156 Standard Extended Range Block IV (SM-2ER Block IV) terminal-phase interceptors developed by Raytheon. The Standard Missile 3 is a development of the SM2-ER Block IV, capable of intercepting ballistic missiles above the atmosphere (i.e., exo-atmospheric intercept) during the midcourse phase of a hostile ballistic missile's flight. The missile is launched from the Mk 41 Vertical Launching System (VLS) of the warships. It receives in-flight target updates from the ship. The kinetic warhead (KW) is designed to destroy a ballistic missile's warhead with more than 130 megajoules of kinetic energy by colliding with it. The existing SM-3 Block IA version will be upgraded to SM-3 Block IB, SM-3 Block IIA and SM-3 Block IIB to counter future ballistic missile threats.

The SM-2ER Block IV can engage the ballistic missiles within the atmosphere (i.e., endoatmospheric intercept) in the terminal phase of a missile's trajectory. The missile carries a blast fragmentation warhead. The SM-2ER Block IV was further developed in a new extended range active missile, RIM-174 Standard ERAM (Standard Missile 6), which adds an active radar homing seeker. SM-6 is a dual-capability missile that can be used for either air defense (i.e., countering aircraft and anti-ship cruise missiles) or terminal ballistic missile defense; it is not meant to replace the SM-2 series of missiles, but will serve alongside and provide extended range and increased firepower.  In January 2018 the Navy approved plans to develop a Dual Thrust Rocket Motor for the SM-6, with a larger 21-inch diameter to replace the current 13.5-inch propulsion package. The new rocket motor would sit atop the current 21-inch booster, producing a new variant of the missile: the SM-6 Block IB.

In March 2018 the MDA announced it “is evaluating the technical feasibility of the capability of the SM-3 Block IIA missile, currently under development, against an ICBM-class target. If proven to be effective against an ICBM, this missile could add a layer of protection, augmenting the currently deployed GMD system.” The MDA plans to conduct a demonstration of the SM-3 Block IIA against an ICBM-like target by the end of 2020. On November 17, 2020 an SM-3 Block IIA missile successfully intercepted a threat-representative Intercontinental Ballistic Missile (ICBM) target in its mid-course phase of flight, reaffirming the capability to intercept non-separating, simple separating, and complex-separating ballistic missiles.

Glide Phase Interceptor (GPI) will provide defense against hypersonic weapons. Glide Phase Interceptor will be integrated with modified Baseline 9 Aegis Weapon System.

Aegis Ashore

As of the 2014 NATO Wales summit a land-based component, Aegis Ashore, was being developed. The first site to be declared operational was Deveselu Romania in 2016.  This consists of equipment commonly used by the Navy being deployed in land-based facilities. This includes SPY-1 radars and a battery of Standard Missile-3s. The Obama administration's plans call for two sites: the first in Romania at Deveselu that was opened in May 2015 and the second in Redzikowo, Poland (planned for 2018, but delayed twice, to 2022). In 2020, both will get the latest versions of the Aegis BMD software and the latest version of the SM-3. Some radar facilities will be placed in Turkey at a future date.

On 21 May 2014, U.S. DOD headlined, "Standard Missile Completes First Test Launch from Aegis Ashore Test Site," and reported that: "The Missile Defense Agency, the U.S. Navy, and sailors at the Aegis Ashore Missile Defense Test Complex and Pacific Missile Range Facility (PMRF), successfully conducted the first flight test involving components of the Aegis Ashore system. During the test, a simulated ballistic missile target was acquired, tracked, and engaged by the Aegis Weapon System. At approximately 7:35 p.m. Hawaii Standard Time, May 20 (1:35 a.m. EDT, May 21), the Aegis Weapon System fired a Standard Missile (SM)-3 Block IB guided missile from the Vertical Launch System. Several fire control and engagement functions were exercised during the test. A live target missile launch was not planned for this flight test."

On 19 December 2017, the Cabinet of Japan approved a plan to purchase two Aegis Ashore systems equipped with the AN/SPY-7(V)1, based on Lockheed Martin's LRDR to increase Japan’s self-defence capability against North Korea, using SM-3 Block IIA missiles, and also could work with SM-6 interceptors capable of shooting down cruise missiles. The installation sites are at a Ground Self-Defense Force training area in Araya District, Akita Prefecture and the Mutsumi training area in Hagi, Yamaguchi Prefecture.

On 15 June 2020, Japanese Defense Minister Taro Kono announced that work had been halted on the deployment of the system because additional costs would be needed to ensure that residential buildings would not be hit by rocket boosters used to launch the missiles. Later in the month Japan's National Security Council confirmed the cancellation of the plan. On 23 September 2020, Lockheed Martin commented that it'll be expensive to potentially convert the AA system for maritime use since a revamp in the design is required.

In July 2020 Admiral Philip S. Davidson, the head of United States Indo-Pacific Command advised that he sought funding to construct an Aegis Ashore system in Guam by 2026 both to defend existing U.S. military facilities on Guam and to provide offensive "long-range precision strike capability into the First Island Chain" dominated by China. Speaking in March 2021 Davidson said that the "Guam Defense System" of an Aegis Ashore Facility would free up three Arleigh Burke-class destroyers for service elsewhere. Davidson said that Chinese submarines and surface ships together with its ballistic missiles pose "a 360-degree threat" to Guam beyond the capabilities of the existing Terminal High Altitude Area Defense system on Guam.

Deployment

Aegis Ashore
The U.S., Romania and Poland have deployed the land based Aegis BMD. Test installation was built at the US Pacific Missile Range Facility in Hawaii in 2000s. A site in Deveselu, Romania is operational since 2016, while a site at Redzikowo, Poland will become operational in 2022. Though Japan intended to deploy two sites which would use an AN/SPY-7 AESA radar, these plans were cancelled in 2020. Possible deployments of Aegis Ashore include US naval base at Guam.

U.S. Navy Aegis BMD vessels
As of October 2017, there were 5 s and 28 Arleigh Burke-class destroyers (DDGs 51–78) of the US Navy's Arleigh Burke-class destroyers equipped with BMD in the U.S. Navy. Of the 33 ships, 17 are assigned to the Pacific Fleet and 16 to the Atlantic Fleet. The Navy's FY2015 30-year (FY2015-FY2043) shipbuilding plan projects that the total number of Aegis cruisers and destroyers will be between 80 and 97 during the 30-year period.

Japanese Aegis BMD vessels

Japan's foreign minister, Hirofumi Nakasone and South Korea's Minister of Foreign Affairs, Yu Myung-hwan, agreed that early April 5, 2009, launch of the North Korean Unha-2 satellite violated UN resolutions 1695 and 1718 of July 2006. Japan's cabinet examined approval of a JMSDF AEGIS BMD engagement in the event of a failure of the Taepondong launch. The Japanese government also noted that it could bypass cabinet for an interception under Article 82, Section 2, Paragraph 3 of the Self-Defence Forces law. In total, five AEGIS destroyers were deployed at that time. Supplemental to SM-3 capability the Japanese system incorporates an airborne component. Together discrimination between platform tests and satellite launches is possible by analyzing the angle of ascent.

On August 31, 2022, the Japan Ministry of Defense announced that JMSDF will operate two "Aegis system equipped ships" (イージス・システム搭載艦 in Japanese) (pictured) to replace its earlier cancellation of the Aegis Ashore program, commissioning one ship by the end of fiscal year 2027, and the other by the end of FY2028. The budget for design and other related expenses are to be submitted in the form of “item requests”, without specific amounts, and the initial procurement of the lead items are expected to clear legislation by FY2023. Construction is to begin in the following year of FY2024.  When completed, at  each, the two warships will be the largest surface combatant ships operated by Japan.

On 6 October 2022, five warships from the United States, Japan, and South Korea held a multilateral ballistic missile defense exercise in the Sea of Japan (pictured) as part of the military response to ongoing North Korean intermediate-range ballistic missile tests over the Japanese home islands.

On 16 November 2022, the guided-missile destroyer  fired an SM-3 Block IIA missile, successfully intercepting the target outside the atmosphere in the first launch of the missile from a Japanese warship. On 18 November 2022, the  likewise fired an SM-3 Block IB missile with a successful hit outside the atmosphere (pictured). Both test firings were conducted at the U.S. Pacific Missile Range Facility on Kauai Island, Hawaii, in cooperation with the U.S. Navy and U.S. Missile Defense Agency. This was the first time the two ships conducted SM-3 firings in the same time period, and the testes validated the ballistic missile defense capabilities of Japan’s newest s.

On 23 December 2022, the Japanese Ministry of Defense's 2023 budget and program guidance illustrated examples of operation (運用の一例) for the Aegis-equipped naval forces of the Japanese Maritime Self Defense Force (MSDF).  The two ASEV warship would be exclusively tasked for dedicated ballistic missile defense (BDM) missions (BMD等) and operate off the Korean peninsula in the Sea of Japan, allowing the other Aegis guided-missile destroyers to meet other contingencies (侵攻阻止) while operating independently to keeping the sea lines of communication (SLOC) open in the East China Sea southwest of the Japanese home islands.
List of JMSDF Aegis Afloat ships (Aegis BMD vessels)

Joint BMD patrols
In early October 2022, five warships from the United States, Japan, and South Korea held a ballistic missile defense exercise (pictured) in the Sea of Japan as part of the ongoing military response to ongoing North Korean intermediate-range ballistic missile tests over the Japanese home islands.

Political debate
Tom Laliberty of Raytheon said that President Barack Obama was forced to shift from a land based missile defense system to a sea based one because of the difficulties of coordinating with partner nations. There is discussion about the effectiveness of this plan. Some critics say it is not as effective as a ground-based defense since the most advanced Standard missiles lack even half the range to hit ICBMs and even IRBMs arcing overhead. Also, the U.S. Defense Department has said it would be just one component of a wider defense which might also include ground-based facilities.

A Navy panel headed by retired Vice Adm. Phillip Balisle has asserted that since the late 1990s there has been an over-emphasis on saving money, including cuts in crews and streamlined training and maintenance, which has led to a drastic decline in readiness, and has left Aegis combat systems in low state of readiness. And in spite of a reduction in the objective for the number of Aegis armed warships to field, the U.S. Navy will still fall short of this reduced objective under the fiscal year for 2012 shipbuilding plan for the next 30 years.

International reaction

The Russian government claims that the system is "fueling a new arms race", and is constructed "on ridiculous fabricated pretexts" of protection against non-existent threats of the so-called rogue states. Dmitry Rogozin, the Deputy Prime Minister of the Russian government, said that the country would "react in the sharpest manner" to any American ships armed with the system found near their shores.

Other capabilities

The Aegis BMD system, coupled with the RIM-161 Standard missile (SM-3), has also demonstrated a limited capability as an anti-satellite weapon against satellites in the lower portion of low Earth orbit. On February 20, 2008, USA 193 was destroyed by a group of Aegis ships in the Pacific; the stated reason was concern that satellite's hydrazine payload might contaminate land area upon re-entry from an uncontrolled orbit. Interception was at an altitude of 133 nautical miles (247 kilometers).

Target for simulating endo-atmospheric flight of DF-21 ASBM

According to a Congressional Research Service report dated July 31, 2014, the lack of a test target simulating the Chinese DF-21 ASBM is highlighted. 
A threat representative Anti-Ship Ballistic Missile (ASBM) target for operational open-air testing has become an immediate test resource need. China is fielding the DF-21D ASBM, which threatens U.S. and allied surface warships in the Western Pacific. While the Missile Defense Agency has exo-atmospheric targets in development, no program currently exists for an endo-atmospheric target. The endo-atmospheric ASBM target is the Navy’s responsibility, but it is not currently budgeted. The Missile Defense Agency estimates the non-recurring expense to develop the exo-atmospheric target was $30 million with each target costing an additional $30 million; the endo-atmospheric target will be more expensive to produce according to missile defense analysts. Numerous Navy acquisition programs will require an ASBM surrogate in the coming years, although a limited number of targets (3-5) may be sufficient to validate analytical models

The December 2012 report from DOT&E (i.e., DOT&E's annual report for FY2012) did not further discuss this issue; a January 21, 2013, press report stated that this is because the details of the issue are classified.

The U.S. arsenal has a "variety of potential countermeasures" and the "kill chain" of for example a potential DF-21D attack would be so "complicated" that it would provide a "number of opportunities to defeat the attack". He also stated that unless one country integrates an "entire system of systems" to make this work, the missile itself would be pretty "useless".
“Some countries might buy them just to impress their neighbors, but their combat effectiveness would be negligible unless the country also invested in the needed detection, data processing, and communications systems". - Roger Cliff

A December 16, 2016, press report states the following:
The Missile Defense Agency (MDA) said its new Sea Based Terminal (SBT) system achieved its second ballistic missile intercept during a Dec. 14 test over the Pacific Ocean.
During the test, the USS John Paul Jones (DDG-53)... fired a salvo of two Raytheon [RTN] Standard Missile-6 (SM-6) interceptors in immediate succession against a medium-range ballistic missile target launched from the Pacific Missile Range Facility on Kauai, Hawaii. The first interceptor was not armed and was designed to collect test data, MDA said. The second interceptor, which carried an explosive warhead, intercepted the Lockheed Martin-built target….

MDA called the target “complex” but declined to elaborate. However, according to the Missile Defense Advocacy Alliance, the target emulated China's Dong-Feng 21 (DF-21), a ballistic missile equipped with a maneuverable re-entry vehicle and designed to destroy U.S., aircraft carriers. The event, designated Flight Test Standard Missile-27 (FTM-27), was SBT's first salvo test and its second intercept in as many tries.

In March 2020, Mike Griffin, the Under Secretary of Defense for Research and Engineering, revealed that SM-6 missile was being considered for hypersonic defense and that there are plans to test it against an actual hypersonic boost-glide vehicle in the 2023 Fiscal Year.
 
An April 14, 2021 press report stated:
The Missile Defense Agency, together with the U.S. Navy, plan to test an SM-6 missile against an “advanced maneuvering threat,” a term that has been used in relation to unpowered hypersonic boost-glide vehicles, later this year. The Pentagon says that unspecified versions of the SM-6 have already demonstrated some degree of capability against these types of weapons, examples of which Russia and China have already begun putting to service. A new variant of the SM-6, the Block IB, is already under development and will itself be able to reach hypersonic speeds. Barbara McQuiston, a senior U.S. official currently performing the duties of the Under Secretary of Defense for Research and Engineering, including mention of the scheduled SM-6 test in her testimony before the Senate Appropriations Committee’s Subcommittee on Defense yesterday….

Flight tests to date
As of December 2018, Aegis BMDS has performed 40 successful intercepts in 49 attempts against ballistic missile targets.

Gallery

See also
 Aegis Weapon System
 Anti-ballistic missile
 Arrow missile
 Atago-class destroyer
 Ballistic Missile Defense Organization
 Indian Ballistic Missile Defence Programme
 Kinetic Energy Interceptor
 MIM-104 Patriot missile
 National Missile Defense
 NATO missile defence system
 Pacific Missile Range Facility
 RIM-161 Standard Missile 3
 Strategic Defense Initiative
 Terminal High Altitude Area Defense (THAAD)
 Ticonderoga class cruiser
 Vertical Launching System
 YAL-1 Airborne Laser

Notes

References

External links
 Aegis BMD web page, U.S. Missile Defense Agency official website.
 CSIS Missile Threat - Aegis BMD 
 U.S. Navy Juggles Ships To Fill BMD Demands, By Christopher P. Cavas, defensenews.com, January 4, 2010.
 How Many Aegis Ships To Defend NATO?, By Jeffrey Lewis, June 12, 2007.
 U.S. nears key step in European defense shield against Iranian missiles, By Craig Whitlock, Washington Post, August 1, 2010.
 Under the New Missile Defense Plan There Are Still Options for Assurance, John Warden, csis.org.
 , US Missile defense credibility, North Korea case.

Missile Defense Agency
Naval weapons of the United States
Naval guided missile launch systems of the United States